Remote Control Productions, Inc. is a film score company run by composer Hans Zimmer and based in Santa Monica, California. Originally known as Media Ventures Entertainment Group, which was conceived and founded by Jay Rifkin and Hans Zimmer, the company changed its name after the partners both filed lawsuits against each other. Today, Remote Control is home to a large group of composers mentored by Zimmer, many of whom have had successful film scoring careers as part of the company or on their own.

Remote Control Productions has been responsible for the scores for a number of successful live-action films including the Pirates of the Caribbean movies, Iron Man, Gladiator, Mission: Impossible 2, The Last Samurai, Transformers, Hancock, Kingdom of Heaven, The Da Vinci Code, Inception, Sherlock Holmes and its sequel, and The Dark Knight Trilogy, along with successful animated films such as the Shrek series, Kung Fu Panda, Madagascar, The Lion King, and more.
Many composers from Remote Control Productions have also worked on the scores of successful video games such as the Metal Gear and Skylanders series, The Sims 3, Gears of War 2, Call of Duty: Modern Warfare, its sequel, Call of Duty: Modern Warfare 2, Crysis 2, Assassin's Creed: Revelations, and Assassin's Creed III. Harry Gregson-Williams was the first Media Ventures composer to work in the video game industry on Metal Gear Solid 2: Sons of Liberty in 2001. Klaus Badelt, Stephen Barton, Steve Jablonsky, Lorne Balfe, and Hans Zimmer joined a few years later.

Composers 
Composers who are working or have worked with Hans Zimmer at Remote Control Productions include:

  Max Aruj
  Jeff Ali
  Klaus Badelt
  Lorne Balfe
  Stephen Barton
  Tyler Bates
  Thomas J. Bergersen
  David Buckley
  Justin Burnett
  Toby Chu
  Marko Cirkovic
  Ramin Djawadi
  James Dooley
  Clay Duncan
  Ebers Evgeny
  Nima Fakhrara
  Harold Faltermeyer
  Lisa Gerrard
  Tom Gire
  Nick Glennie-Smith
  Harry Gregson-Williams
  Rupert Gregson-Williams
  Gavin Greenaway
  PJ Hanke
  Don L. Harper
  Richard Harvey
  Pete Haycock
  Tom Holkenborg
  Tom Howe
  James Newton Howard
  Steve Jablonsky
  Henry Jackman
  Bryce Jacobs
  Kreng
  James S. Levine
  Michael A. Levine
  Dominic Lewis
  Henning Lohner
  Mark Mancina
  Steve Mazzaro
  Michael John Mollo
  Trevor Morris
  Paul Mounsey
  Amirhossein Mousavi
  Blake Neely
  Julian Nott
  Atli Örvarsson
  Heitor Pereira
  Nick Phoenix
  John Powell
  Trevor Rabin
  Guillaume Roussel
  Batu Sener
  Diego Stocco
  Marc Streitenfeld
  Hangi Tavakoli
  Martin Tillman
  Stuart Michael Thomas
  Steffen Thum
  Pinar Toprak
  John Van Tongeren
  Benjamin Wallfisch
  James Weiss
  Mel Wesson
  Nathan Whitehead
  Anthony B. Willis
  Christopher Willis
  will.i.am
  Robb Williamson
  Pharrell Williams
  Geoff Zanelli

Criticism 
Christian Clemmensen of Filmtracks has noted Zimmer's use of ghostwriters. Other reviewers have also criticized Zimmer's approach to scoring films, as well as Remote Control Productions' dominance.

References

External links 
 Official website (Under Construction)
 Official fansite
  Remote Control at IMDB.com

Music publishing companies of the United States
Film soundtracks
Companies based in California
Hans Zimmer